Christian Lubich (born 29 July 1959) is an Austrian mathematician, specializing in numerical analysis.

Education and career
After secondary education at the Bundesrealgymnasium in Innsbruck, Lubich studied mathematics at the University of Innsbruck from 1977 to graduation with Magister degree in 1981. He was from 1979 to 1981 a student assistant in Innsbruck and from 1981 to 1983 a research associate in the Sonderforschungsbereich 123 Stochastische mathematische Modelle at the University of Heidelberg. He received his doctorate in 1983 from the University of Innsbruck with dissertation Zur Stabilität linearer Mehrschrittverfahren für Volterra-Gleichungen (On stability of linear multistep methods for Volterra equations) under Ernst Hairer and habilitated there in 1987. Lubich was from 1983 to 1987 a university assistant in Innsbruck, in 1986/87 an assistant at the University of Geneva, in 1987/88 a visiting professor at the IRMAR at the University of Rennes, and in 1988 a visiting professor at the University of Geneva. He was from 1991 to 1992 an assistant professor at ETH Zurich and from 1992 to 1994 a professor of applied mathematics at University of Würzburg. He is since 1994 a professor of numerical mathematics at the University of Tübingen.

Lubich received in 2001 the Dahlquist Prize of the Society for Industrial and Applied Mathematics (SIAM) and in 1985 the Research Prize of the city of Innsbruck. In 2018 at the International Congress of Mathematicians (ICM) in Rio de Janeiro, he was a plenary speaker with talk Dynamics, numerical analysis, and some geometry, written jointly with his former doctoral student Ludwig Gauckler and with Ernst Hairer.

Lubich has been a member of the editorial board of Numerische Mathematik since 1995, of Ricerche di Matematica and of the IMA Journal of Numerical Analysis since 2006, of BIT Numerical Mathematics since 1996, and of SIAM Journal on Scientific Computing from 1996 to 2001.

Selected publications

Articles

 MEXX — Numerical Software for the Integration of Constrained Mechanical Multibody Systems, Preprint SC 92–12 (December 1992)

; preprint

Books
 (pbk reprint of 1989 original)
;

References

External links
Homepage in Tübingen

1959 births
Living people
Austrian mathematicians
Numerical analysts
Academic staff of ETH Zurich
University of Innsbruck alumni
Academic staff of the University of Tübingen